Danie Olbio, also Nek Namira is a librarian and women's rights activist from the Cocos (Keeling) Islands. She is a librarian on Home Island and is chairperson of Kaum Ibu (Women's Group). In 2015 she was secretary of Persatuan Kebudayaan Pulu Kokos.

References 

Living people
Year of birth missing (living people)
Librarians
Women's rights activists
Cocos (Keeling) Islands society
Women librarians